Rebecca Ritters (born 26 January 1984) is an Australian journalist and current news anchor for Deutsche Welle. Prior to her journalism career, she was an actress.

Career 
She is also known as an actress, mostly for her role as Hannah Martin in the soap opera Neighbours. She first appeared in the show in 1992 when she was eight years old, and remained for a further seven years. Ritters briefly reprised the role of Hannah as part of Neighbours' 20th anniversary celebrations.

After leaving Neighbours in 1999, Ritters appeared as Caz in the Australian soap Pig's Breakfast in 2000, and as Amelia Porter in Blue Heelers in 2001.

In 2002, Ritters toured with the British Shakespeare Company in an open-air production of Romeo and Juliet, playing Juliet opposite Tama Matheson as Romeo, and in the same year played Peaseblossom in A Midsummer Night's Dream with Wayne Sleep as Puck, also an open-air production. In December 2002 and January 2003, she also played Dorothy in The Wizard of Oz at the Hazlitt Theatre in Maidstone, Kent.
Also in 2002 she appeared in the British soap opera Coronation Street, playing Australian backpacker Jules Robinson who briefly boarded with Les Battersby, and who playfully sent up his mistaken belief that she intended to seduce him.

Ritters has gone on to travel extensively throughout Europe and America, studying acting at a prestigious college in New York  and working on the stage in the UK. She also had a full-time job as a receptionist at Warner Bros Records. She had a short stint in the Australian medical drama All Saints, in which she played Nurse Rachel Simms.

In 2011, Ritters enrolled in undergraduate study in Politics and International Relations at the University of Melbourne. She then worked as a news and current affairs producer for the Australian Broadcasting Corporation. In 2015, she started as a journalist for Deutsche Welle in Berlin.

References

External links
 

1984 births
Australian child actresses
Living people
Australian soap opera actresses